Julia Boyer Reinstein (November 3, 1906 – July 18, 1998) was an American teacher and historian who grew up in western New York and began her career teaching in Deadwood, South Dakota. After more than a decade of teaching, she became a founder of the Erie County Historical Federation and the first historian of Cheektowaga, New York. Committed to preserving the history of the area and educating citizens about their heritage, she and her husband were instrumental in donating properties for the establishment of a nature preserve, several libraries and to higher education. She was a subject of an anthropological study evaluating gender fluidity and the nature of being public about one's sexuality in the 1990s.

Early life
Julia Agnes Boyer was born on November 3, 1906 in Castile, New York to Julia (née Smith) and Lee Boyer. Boyer's father, was an engineer who worked with Western Union Telegraph Company and then on various power and light projects throughout the Great Plains including Kansas City and St. Louis, Missouri and in Indian Territory, before becoming the general manager of the Consolidated Power and Light Company in the Black Hills of South Dakota. When Boyer was six weeks old, her mother left New York to join her father who was working on an engineering job in Wolseley, Saskatchewan. Her parents divorced when she was about a 1½-years old, and her mother took her back to Castile, where she found work as a school teacher. Her mother's family, were prominent in rural western New York, where her grandfather, Frederick H. Smith worked as a cattleman, lawyer and banker. Her great-aunt and -uncle, Julia A. (née Pickett) and Fred Norris, who helped raise Boyer, were the owners of the newspaper in Warsaw, New York.

In 1915, her mother remarried Charles Mason, the owner of a general store in Silver Springs. Boyer remained in Warsaw, living with the Norrises, and visited her mother and step-rather on weekends. Her father was not allowed to make contact with Boyer, per the terms of her parents' divorce, until she turned eighteen. In 1924 Boyer enrolled at Elmira College and began exploring her lesbian feelings. In 1926, her father made contact with her and they met. He was accepting of her lesbianism and the two began an intense relationship to get reacquainted. When she graduated in 1928 with a bachelor's degree and a teaching certificate, Boyer moved to Deadwood, South Dakota to live with her father and step-mother, Sarah Isabel (née Rouch).

Arriving in Deadwood, Boyer began accompanying her father on business trips. She developed numerous flirtations with other women and while with her family and intimate circle, she was open about her sexual attraction, she remained very discreet, as was dictated by the times. Her father, who often flew in his private plane to inspect the power plants he managed throughout Missouri, Nebraska and South Dakota, supported her affairs, and even helped arrange them, as long as she maintained discretion and did not report his own extramarital affairs.

Career
With the advent of the Great Depression, Boyer took a job in one of the mining camps near Deadwood and worked there for two years. When she decided to continue her education in Chicago, her father did not want her to leave and used his influence to help her obtain employment in the Deadwood school system. In 1930, she met another teacher and fell in love and for the first time contemplated what a committed lesbian relationship was. They developed a circle of other lesbian couples, and though they did not hide their relationships, they did not discuss them. When Boyer's father died unexpectedly in 1933, she left Deadwood and returned to her mother's family in New York. She obtained a teaching position in the conservative town of Castile bringing Dorothy with her. During the week, she rented rooms in town, but on weekends she and Dorothy shared a suite her mother and step-father had created for them in their home. During their summer breaks, the couple rented an apartment in New York City, to facilitate their taking master's courses at Columbia University.

In the early 1940s, Boyer and Dorothy broke up and Julia accepted employment in Buffalo. The circumstances, much different than those she experienced with the comfortable protection of her family, did not allow her to find female companions. Soon after she attained her master's degree in education from Columbia, Boyer married Dr. Victor Reinstein on 28 September 1942 in Baltimore, Maryland, and thereafter used the name Julia Boyer Reinstein, both to avoid being associated with Nazis and to acknowledge that she never truly gave up her lesbian orientation. After teaching in New York state for a decade, Boyer Reinstein worked for a year and a half at the University of Buffalo in the history department. In 1953, she became the first historian of Cheektowaga and was one of the founders of the Erie County Historical Federation, serving as its president. When the Federation was founded there were only seven affiliates, which reached twenty-eight societies during her tenure.

Boyer Reinstein was active in multiple endeavors, serving as vice chair of the Cheektowaga Public Library board and as a member of the Erie County Historical Preservation Committee. She was a sought after speaker, and in addition to publishing map books and stories on county history, she and her husband became benefactors for the area. They donated the property for the Reinstein Woods Nature Preserve and built the Anna M. Reinstein Library in Cheektowaga. After her husband's death in 1984, Boyer Reinstein resumed her life as a lesbian. In 1990, Boyer Reinstein began a series of donations to her alma mater to enable Elmira College to establish the Department of Women's Studies. An annual symposium in her honor is held by the college to promote scholarship on women. The couple also donated funds to establish the Julia Boyer Reinstein Library in Cheektowaga and the Buffalo History Museum's Julia Boyer Reinstein Center on the museum's campus.

Death and legacy
Boyer Reinstein died on July 18, 1998 and her memorial was held on 22 July in Cheektowaga, New York. Reinstein was the subject of an anthropological study of LGBT life, done by Elizabeth Lapovsky Kennedy written as supplemental research to her Boots of Leather, Slippers of Gold (1993) to evaluate the difference between middle-class and upper-class lesbian lives. The study, was important  for the understanding of what it meant to be "out" as a lesbian, women's sexual energy in the period, and the acceptance of her sexuality by her parents. Because of her families' prominence in their communities, and the taboos of talking about intimacy publicly, lesbians in her social class were protected and allowed to live their lives as long as they remained in traditional appearance as dutiful daughters and respected social niceties. Sexuality was seen as a private concern and rumors were gracefully ignored to preserve one's standing in the community. By examining Boyer Reinstein's life, the complexities of a closeted existence emerged, showing that for women in upper classes, being in the closet was not oppressive, but rather, allowed them the freedom to express themselves as long as their expression was in the private, rather than public sphere.

References

Citations

Bibliography

 
 

 

 
 
 
 

 
 

 
 

1906 births
1998 deaths
People from Wyoming County, New York
People from Deadwood, South Dakota
Elmira College alumni
Columbia University alumni
University at Buffalo faculty
20th-century American historians
American lesbians
Philanthropists from New York (state)
LGBT people from New York (state)
LGBT people from South Dakota
American women historians
20th-century American philanthropists
20th-century American women educators
20th-century American educators
Historians from New York (state)
20th-century American LGBT people
20th-century women philanthropists
LGBT historians